UFC on Fuel TV: Barão vs. McDonald (also known as UFC on Fuel TV 7) was a mixed martial arts event held by the Ultimate Fighting Championship on February 16, 2013, at Wembley Arena in London, United Kingdom.

Background

Dennis Siver was expected to face Cub Swanson at the event; however, Siver was forced out of the bout, and was replaced by Dustin Poirier.

Justin Edwards was expected to face Gunnar Nelson at the event; however, Edwards was forced to pull out of the bout citing an injury, and was replaced by returning veteran Jorge Santiago.

Results

Bonus Awards

Fighters were awarded $50,000 bonuses.
 Fight of the Night:  Tom Watson vs.  Stanislav Nedkov
 Knockout of the Night: Tom Watson
 Submission of the Night: Renan Barão

See also
List of UFC events
2013 in UFC

References

UFC on Fuel TV
2013 in mixed martial arts
Mixed martial arts in the United Kingdom
Sport in the London Borough of Brent
2013 in English sport
Events in London